Košarkarski klub Triglav Kranj, commonly referred to as KK Triglav or simply Triglav, is a basketball team based in Kranj, Slovenia. The club was founded in 1950 as a basketball section of TVD Partizan Kranj. It was renamed as KK Triglav in 1954 and currently competes as ECE Triglav due to sponsorship reasons. They play their home games at the Planina Sports Hall in Kranj.

External links
Official website 

Basketball teams established in 1950
Basketball teams in Slovenia
Sport in Kranj
Basketball teams in Yugoslavia
1950 establishments in Slovenia